Novotel Sarajevo Bristol (formerly Hotel Bristol) is a mid-scale 4-star hotel that has operated under the Accor groups's Novotel brand since re-opening in 2011. The hotel is located at Fra Filipa Lastrića 2, Sarajevo, Bosnia and Herzegovina.

Location
Hotel building is located in the suburb of Pofalići, on the right bank of the Miljacka river, across from the neighbouring suburb of Grbavica and Grbavica Stadium. It's situated near Vilsonovo Šetalište and features river and city views.

History
Built in 1973, the hotel was originally named Hotel Bristol, having replaced an old hotel of the same name nearby. During the Siege of Sarajevo the building was bombarded by Serbian forces from across the river Miljacka. The hotel was subsequently restored and privatised in 2010.

Restaurants and bars
Dining options include a European restaurant, an international restaurant and a brasserie serving international cuisine. The Café Bristol serves pastries, cakes and a wide selection of hot and cold beverages. There are 2 cafe-bars, one of which has a seated terrace.

Facilities
The contemporary rooms feature free Wi-Fi, flat-screen TVs and safes. The suites have living rooms and jacuzzis. The fitness and spa area includes a sauna, an indoor swimming pool, massage tables and exercise bikes. A prayer room is available as are 4 meeting rooms. Parking at the hotel is free.

Awards and recognition
Novotel Sarajevo Bristol is the recipient of several World Travel Awards, namely "Bosnia and Herzegovina's Leading Hotel" for 2012, 2013, 2014 and 2018.

References

External links

Novotel Sarajevo Bristol
Bosnia and Herzegovina's Leading Hotel 2012, 2013, 2014 and 2018 - World Travel Awards

Hotels in Sarajevo
Hotels in Bosnia and Herzegovina
Hotel buildings completed in 1973
Hotels established in 2012
Sarajevo Bristol